The Ajax Sportsplex is a baseball and softball facility located in Ajax, Ontario, Canada that hosted the baseball and softball competitions at the 2015 Pan American Games. During the games the venue was known as the President's Choice Ajax Ballpark.

Description

The facility consists of four softball diamonds and two baseball diamonds at Taunton Road and Audley Road in north east Ajax. Prior to the games the facility received 9 million dollars in upgrades to ensure it met World Baseball Softball Confederation standards, which included converting two soccer fields into a baseball diamond and the adjacent existing baseball diamond being rebuilt with new sod and clay.  During the games the Sportsplex housed four stadiums. Two premier fields had temporary seating for 5,000 each, with one being for baseball and one for softball and two competition fields had 1,200 seats each (one for each sport).

Requirements
The Organizers set a few benchmarks for selecting the venue.
The venue was owned by the city.
The venue was within the games area.
The site would ideally have a training facility as well.
The facility would be ready to start construction in late March 2013.
A binding agreement would have to be signed by end of July 2012.
Easy access to public transit.
Agree to cover 44% of the costs.

Hamilton and Vaughan considered bidding, but ultimately chose not to.

Photo gallery

See also
Venues of the 2015 Pan American and Parapan American Games

References

External links
Toronto 2015 - President's Choice Ajax Ballpark 
Town of Ajax Sports Fields
Design plan

Venues of the 2015 Pan American Games
Baseball venues in Ontario
Softball venues in Ontario
Ajax, Ontario